This is a list of Colgate Raiders football players in the NFL Draft.

Key

Selections

References

Colgate

Colgate Raiders NFL Draft